Terrance William Dicks (14 April 1935 – 29 August 2019) was an English author and television screenwriter, script editor and producer. In television, he had a long association with the BBC science-fiction series Doctor Who, working as a writer and also serving as the programme's script editor from 1968 to 1974. The Doctor Who News Page described him as "arguably the most prolific contributor to Doctor Who". He later became a script editor and producer of classic serials for the BBC.

Dicks wrote many children's books during the 1970s and 1980s. He also maintained his association with Doctor Who by adapting televised stories into novelisations for Target Books and in later years contributing to many documentaries and DVD commentaries for the series.

Early career
Born in East Ham, Essex (now part of Greater London), Dicks was the only son of William, a tailor's salesman and Nellie (née Ambler), a waitress. His parents later ran a pub, the Fox and Hounds, in Forest Gate. He excelled in English at East Ham Grammar School and consumed literature ranging from classics to pulp thrillers and adventure stories. He won a scholarship to study English at Downing College, Cambridge, and later performed two years of National Service in the British Army with the Royal Fusiliers. Following his discharge from the armed forces, he worked for five years as an advertising copywriter, and started to write radio play scripts for the BBC in his spare time.

His breakthrough into television came when friend Malcolm Hulke, whom he met when he rented a room from him, asked for his help with the scripting of "The Mauritius Penny", an episode of the second series of ABC's action-adventure The Avengers, for which Dicks was awarded a co-writer's credit. Dicks went on to co-write a further two Avengers episodes with Hulke: the second, "Intercrime", was later re-worked for the sixth and final series.

Doctor Who
In 1968, Dicks was hired as assistant script editor on the BBC science-fiction TV series Doctor Who. He was appointed head script editor the following year and earned his first writing credit for the programme when he and Hulke co-wrote the 10-part serial The War Games, which concluded the series' sixth season and the Second Doctor's (Patrick Troughton) tenure. The serial introduced the concept of the Time Lords and initiated the Doctor's exile to Earth, which would be a major theme of the Third Doctor's tenure. Dicks had, however, been the uncredited co-writer of the earlier serial The Seeds of Death (1969), having extensively re-written Brian Hayles' original scripts.

Dicks formed a highly productive working relationship with incoming Doctor Who producer Barry Letts, serving as script editor on all of Letts's five seasons as series producer from 1970 to 1974. During his tenure as script editor on Doctor Who, Dicks oversaw a number of additions to the program's mythology that still exist in the modern era including the following:

 The development of the Time Lords and their society.
 The name Gallifrey (augmented from Doctor Who writer Robert Holmes' "Galfrey").
 The creation of companions Liz Shaw, Jo Grant, and Sarah Jane Smith.
 The term "regeneration". (Planet of the Spiders)
 An established race of villainous monsters turn to the side of good. (the Ice Warriors in The Curse of Peladon by Brian Hayles)
 Sontarans (from writer Robert Holmes).
 The Dematerialisation Circuit is vital for the operation of the TARDIS.
 The concept that the TARDIS is indestructible.
 The TARDIS can be remote controlled.
 The TARDIS has a Telepathic Circuit (in The Time Monster)
 The TARDIS might be sentient (The Time Monster and Planet of the Spiders)
 The Blinovitch Limitation Effect used as a plot device to explain away paradoxes. (Day of the Daleks)
 Multi-Doctor stories. (The Three Doctors)

During Dicks' tenure, the program also delved into social and political concepts. Sometimes these were straightforward and other times they were metaphors. Concepts and topics included the respect for all life (The Silurians), Great Britain joining the European Economic Community (in metaphor in The Curse of Peladon), apartheid (The Mutants), global pollution (The Green Death) and equality for women (with the inclusion of Sarah Jane Smith as companion).

In 1972, Dicks embarked on a parallel career as an author with the publication of his first book, The Making of Doctor Who (a history of the production of the TV series), which was co-written by Hulke.

After stepping down as script editor, Dicks continued his association with Doctor Who, writing four scripts for his successor, Robert Holmes: these were Robot (1975, Tom Baker's first outing as the Fourth Doctor), The Brain of Morbius (1976, for which Dicks was credited under the pseudonym Robin Bland after his displeasure at Holmes' re-writes prompted him to request that it be shown "under some bland pseudonym"), Horror of Fang Rock (1977) and State of Decay (1980).

State of Decay was in fact a re-written version of a story originally titled The Vampire Mutations, which had been due for production during season 15 until the BBC decided that the vampiric theme would clash with the plot of its new adaptation of Bram Stoker's Count Dracula, which was due for transmission at roughly the same time, and replaced it with Horror of Fang Rock. His final Doctor Who script was The Five Doctors (1983), a feature-length episode for the programme's 20th anniversary.

His other work for Doctor Who included two stage plays, Doctor Who and the Daleks in the Seven Keys to Doomsday (1974) and Doctor Who - The Ultimate Adventure (1989), and an audio drama for Big Finish Productions titled Comeback (2002), which was the first to feature former Doctor's companion Sarah Jane Smith in a significant capacity. He went on to contribute several additional scripts to Big Finish including audio adaptations of his two-stage plays, a Sixth Doctor-era story for the "Companion Chronicle" range, and a Bernice Summerfield story, in 2011, which was the final script of his career.

The first serial aired after his death, the 2020 Thirteenth Doctor-era story "Spyfall", was dedicated to him.

Books
Dicks contributed heavily to Target Books' series of novelisations of the Doctor Who TV serials, writing 67 of the titles published by the company. As Dicks explains in an interview in the documentary Built for War (included on the 2006 DVD release of The Sontaran Experiment), he served as the unofficial editor of the Target Books range. In this role, he would attempt to enlist the author of the original scripts to write the novelisation whenever possible, but if they refused or had other commitments, Dicks would usually undertake the work himself (although he also recruited other writers, including former Doctor Who actor Ian Marter and former series producer Philip Hinchcliffe).

On one occasion, he enlisted Robert Holmes to novelise his script for The Time Warrior, but when Holmes gave up after writing only one chapter, it was left to Dicks to complete the work. Dicks would have better success in recruiting the original writers for the later Doctor Who serials, and was required to adapt only one Sixth Doctor story himself (The Mysterious Planet; he again replaced Holmes, who had died in 1986). Dicks' name appears on the cover of no Seventh Doctor novelisations. His plans to publish a novelisation of his stage play Doctor Who - The Ultimate Adventure were not realised.

As of September, 1980, Terrance Dicks' Doctor Who novelisations had sold three-and-a-half million copies and had been translated into ten different languages.

During the 1990s, Dicks contributed to Virgin Publishing's line of full-length, officially licensed, original Doctor Who novels, New Adventures, which continued the series' storyline following the TV cancellation in 1989. Dicks wrote three Doctor Who novels for Virgin, and continued to write occasionally for the franchise after BBC Books assumed the licence in 1997. He wrote the first of the Eighth Doctor Adventures, titled The Eight Doctors, which was, for a time, the best-selling original Doctor Who novel. World Game, featuring the Second Doctor, is set during the so-called "Season 6B". Later contributions to the range were the Quick Reads books Made of Steel and Revenge of the Judoon, both featuring the Tenth Doctor and Martha Jones.

His final Doctor Who short story, "Save Yourself", was published posthumously by BBC Books in October 2019.

A compilation of his work chosen by fans entitled The Essential Terrance Dicks Volumes 1 & 2 was published in August 2021.

Other television work
Dicks also wrote for the ATV soap opera Crossroads. He co-created and wrote for the short-lived BBC science-fiction TV series Moonbase 3 (1973), and wrote for the ITC science-fiction series Space: 1999 (1976). During the early 1980s, Dicks served once more as script editor to producer Barry Letts on the BBC's Sunday Classics strand of period dramas and literary adaptations.

When Letts returned to directing in 1985, Dicks succeeded him as the producer of the Sunday Classics, overseeing productions such as Oliver Twist, David Copperfield and Vanity Fair, before retiring from the BBC in 1988 to resume his career as a novelist.

Children's fiction and non-fiction
It was through his work on Doctor Who books that Dicks became a writer of children's fiction, penning many successful titles during the 1970s and 1980s. In 1976, he wrote a trilogy for Target Books, The Mounties, concerning a Royal Canadian Mounted Police recruit. They were followed from 1979 to 1983 another trilogy, Star Quest, which was later re-printed by Big Finish Productions.

Beginning in 1978, Dicks penned The Baker Street Irregulars inspired by the Sherlock Holmes characters; the series eventually ran to 10 books, the last published in 1987. In 1981, he commenced work on a series of six children's horror novels with Cry Vampire. In 1987, Dicks started a new series for very young children titled T. R. Bear, resulting in a further seven books. There followed the Sally Ann series, about a ragdoll, Magnificent Max, about a cat, and The Adventures of Goliath (Dicks' longest series, at 18 books), about a golden retriever. Another five books concerning a St. Bernard dog make up the Harvey series.

Jonathan's Ghost and its three sequels were published in 1988, and the three-part MacMagic series followed in 1990. The Littlest Dinosaur was published in 1993 and The Littlest on Guard in 1994. Other works that Dicks published in 1994 include Woof! The Never Ending Tale, the Cold Blood series and the Chronicles of a Computer Game Addict series (both in four parts). Between 1998 and 2000, Dicks penned Changing Universe trilogy. In 2000 and 2001, Dicks produced the 12-book series, The Unexplained.

As well as his numerous fictional works, Dicks also penned several non-fiction books for children, including Europe United, A Riot of Writers, Uproar in the House, A Right Royal History and The Good, the Bad and the Ghastly.

Personal life 
Dicks lived in Hampstead, London. In 1963, he married Elsa Germaney, a teacher and later a Quaker recording clerk. They had three sons: Stephen, Jonathan and Oliver.

Dicks died in London on 29 August 2019 after a short illness.

Bibliography
Great March West (1976)
Massacre in the Hills (1976)
War Drums of the Blackfoot (1976)
The Case of the Missing Masterpiece (1978)
Spacejack (1978)
The Case of the Blackmail Boys (1979)
Roboworld (1979)
The Case of the Cinema Swindle (1980)
The Case of the Crooked Kids (1980)
The Case of the Ghost Grabbers (1980)
Cry Vampire! (1981)
The Case of the Cop Catchers (1981)
Terrorsaur! (1981)
Ask Oliver (1982)
Marvin's Monster (1982)
Wereboy! (1982)
The Mystery of the Missing Diamond (1983)
Demon of the Dark (1983)
The Fireworks Mystery (1984)
The Mystery of the Missing Train (1984)
Goliath and the Dognappers (1984)
Ghosts of Gallows Cross (1984)
Gupta's Christmas (1985)
Goliath on Holiday (1985)
Goliath at the Dog Show (1986)
Goliath's Christmas (1986)
T.R. Afloat (1986)
T.R.'s Hallowe'en (1986)
In the Money (1986)
The Disappearing Diplomat (1986)
The Case of the Fagin File (1987)
Goliath and the Burglar (1987)
Goliath and the Buried Treasure (1987)
Goliath Goes to Summer School (1987)
Goliath on Vacation (1987)
Goliath's Easter Parade (1987)
Goliath at the Seaside (1988)
T.R's Big Game (1987)
T.R.'s Festival (1987)
Sally Ann, on Her Own (1987)
By the Sea (1987)
School Fair (1987)
The Criminal Computer (1988)
The Haunted Holiday (1988)
Goliath Cub Scouts (1989)
Enter T.R. (1988)
T.R. Bear: Enter T.R., T.R. Goes to School, T.R.'s Day Out, T.R.'s Halloween (1988)
T.R. Goes Skiing (1988)
T.R. Goes to Hollywood (1988)
T.R. Goes to School (1988)
T.R.'s Day Out (1988)
The Picnic (1988)
Sally Ann Goes to Hospital (1988)
Sally Ann's School Play (1988)
In Trouble (1988)
A New Beginning (1988)
Goliath's Sports Day (1989)
T.R. Down Under (1989)
T.R. in New York (1989)
At the Ballet (1989)
The River Rats (1989)
The School Spirit (1989)
Spitfire Summer (1989)
Magnificent Max (1989)
Goliath and the Cub Scouts (1990)
Goliath's Birthday (1990)
Teacher's Pet (1990)
T.R. Bear at the Zoo (1990)
The Pony (1990)
Majestic Max (1990)
Max and the Quiz Kids (1990)
Meet the MacMagics (1990)
My Brother the Vampire (1990)
Lost Property (1990)
Prisoners of War (1990)
The Winjin' Pom (1991)
The Big Match (1991)
Goliath Gets a Job (1991)
Jonathan and the Superstar (1991)
Jonathan's Ghost (1991)
Max's Amazing Summer (1991)
A Spell for My Sister (1991)
George and the Dragon (1991)
What's Going On William (1991)
The Comic Capers (1992)
Sally Ann and the School Show (1992)
Max and the Cat Burglar (1992)
Max and the Missing Megastar (1992)
Steaming Sam (1992)
Knightschool (1992)
War of the Witches (1992)
On Their Own (1993)
Goliath and the School Bully (1993)
Sally Ann and the Mystery Picnic (1993)
Max's Old-fashioned Christmas (1993)
The Littlest Dinosaur (1993)
Nurse Sally Ann (1994)
The Ultimate Game (1994)
Killing Time: Cold Blood 2 (1994)
Littlest on Guard (1994)
Cyberspace Adventure (1994)
Woof! the Never Ending Tale (1994)
Terror in the Swamp (1994)
World War Two (1995)
Harvey to the Rescue (1995)
Escape from Everytown (1995)
Littlest Disappears (1995)
Virtual Unreality (1995)
The Wild West (1996)
World War One (1996)
Harvey and the Beast of Bodmin (1996)
Harvey on Holiday (1996)
The Wollagong Incident (1996)
Murder on the Net (1996)
Jonathan's Ghost: Spitfire Summer, The School Spirit and Jonathan and the Superstar: A Spine-chilling Trilogy (1997)
Harvey and the Swindlers (1997)
Harvey Goes to School (1997)
The Bermuda Triangle Incident (1997)
The Circle of Death Incident (1997)
Stella's Wedding (1990)
Internet Danger (1998)
The Transylvanian Incident (1998)
SS World (1998)
Mets O Hyd (1998)
The Borley Rectory Incident (1998)
The Easter Island Incident (1999)
Mafia Incident (1999)
The Pyramid Incident (1999)
Eco Crash (1999)
Sam the Detective (1999)
The Chinese Ghost Incident (2000)
The Mars Project (2000)
Cassie and the Devil's Charm (2000)
Sci-Fi Danger: Set of 6 (2000)
Endgame (2000)
The Bombay Deaths Incident (2001)
The Inca Alien Incident (2001)
The Nazi Dagger Incident (2001)
Cassie and the Conway Curse: Second Sight II (2001)
Cassie and the Cornish Ghost: Second Sight III (2001)
Cassie and the Riviera Crime (2002)
Nikki and the Drugs Queen Murder (2002)
Star Quest (2003)

Doctor Who

Novelisations
Most of Dicks' Doctor Who novelisations incorporated the prefix "Doctor Who and..." before the title, as did most of the series' novelisations prior to 1981. Several of his novels were subsequently re-printed in omnibus editions, such as The Adventures of Doctor Who and The Dalek Omnibus. In the late 1980s, Star Books issued "2-in-1" collections of selected Target Books novelisations, which included several of Dicks' works.

The Auton Invasion (1974)
The Day of the Daleks (1974)
Terror of the Autons (1975)
The Planet of the Spiders (1975)
The Three Doctors (1975)
The Planet of the Daleks (1976)
The Carnival of Monsters (1977)
The Claws of Axos (1977)
The Mutants (1977)
The Time Warrior (1978; with Robert Holmes, who is uncredited)
Death to the Daleks (1978)
The Monster of Peladon (1980)
Inferno (1984)
The Mind of Evil (1985)
The Time Monster (1985)
Ambassadors of Death (1987)
The Abominable Snowmen (1974)
The Web of Fear (1976)
The Krotons (1985)
The Faceless Ones (1986)
The Seeds of Death (1986)
The Wheel in Space (1988)
The Space Pirates (1990)
The Giant Robot (1975; re-titled Robot for the 1992 edition; Dicks also wrote a version for younger readers, Junior Doctor Who and the Giant Robot, which was published in 1980)
The Loch Ness Monster (1976; re-titled Terror of the Zygons for the 1993 edition)
The Pyramids of Mars (1976)
The Revenge of the Cybermen (1976)
The Genesis of the Daleks (1976)
The Face of Evil (1977)
The Brain of Morbius (1977; Dicks also wrote a version for younger readers, Junior Doctor Who and the Brain of Morbius, which was published in 1980)
The Planet of Evil (1977)
The Deadly Assassin (1977)
The Talons of Weng-Chiang (1977)
The Horror of Fang Rock (1978)
The Android Invasion (1978)
The Hand of Fear (1979)
The Invisible Enemy (1979)
The Robots of Death (1979)
The Image of the Fendahl (1979)
The Destiny of the Daleks (1979)
Underworld (1980)
The Invasion of Time (1980)
The Stones of Blood (1980)
The Androids of Tara (1980)
The Power of Kroll (1980)
The Armageddon Factor (1980)
The Nightmare of Eden (1980)
The Horns of Nimon (1980)
The State of Decay (1981)
The Keeper of Traken (1982)
The Sun Makers (1982)
Meglos (1983)
The Dalek Invasion of Earth (1977)
An Unearthly Child (1981)
The Smugglers (1988)
Planet of Giants (1990)
Four to Doomsday (1983)
Arc of Infinity (1983)
The Five Doctors (1983)
Kinda (1983)
Snakedance (1984)
Warriors of the Deep (1984)
The Caves of Androzani (1984)
The Trial of a Time Lord: The Mysterious Planet (1987)
The Sarah Jane Adventures – Invasion of the Bane (2007)

Original novels
Virgin New Adventures (the Doctor):
Timewyrm: Exodus (1991)
Blood Harvest (1994)
Shakedown (1995)
Virgin New Adventures (Bernice Summerfield):
Mean Streets (1997)
Eighth Doctor Adventures:
The Eight Doctors (1997)
Endgame (2000)
Past Doctor Adventures:
Catastrophea (1998)
Players (1999)
Warmonger (2002)
Deadly Reunion (2003) (with Barry Letts)
World Game (2005)
New Series Adventures (Quick Reads):
Made of Steel (2007)
Revenge of the Judoon (2008)

Original short story
"Save Yourself" in Doctor Who: The Target Storybook (2019)

Non-fiction
 The Making of Doctor Who (1972; co-written with Malcolm Hulke; updated and re-issued in 1976)

Stage plays
Doctor Who and the Daleks in Seven Keys to Doomsday (1974)
Doctor Who – The Ultimate Adventure (1989)

Big Finish audio productions
Sarah Jane Smith audio series
Comeback (2002)
Big Finish stage play adaptations
Seven Keys to Doomsday (2008)
The Ultimate Adventure (2008)
Companion Chronicles
Beyond the Ultimate Adventure (2010)
Bernice Summerfield Short Stories
A Mutual Friend (2011)

Writing credits

Awards and nominations

References

External links

Biography and Interview at BBC Online
Biography at on Target

1935 births
2019 deaths
20th-century British Army personnel
20th-century British dramatists and playwrights
20th-century English dramatists and playwrights
20th-century English male writers
20th-century English non-fiction writers
20th-century pseudonymous writers
21st-century British dramatists and playwrights
21st-century British non-fiction writers
21st-century British short story writers
21st-century English male writers
21st-century English writers
21st-century pseudonymous writers
Alumni of Downing College, Cambridge
BBC television producers
British alternative history writers
British book editors
British children's writers
British copywriters
British male dramatists and playwrights
British male non-fiction writers
British male novelists
British male short story writers
British male television writers
British radio writers
British science fiction writers
British television producers
British television writers
English book editors
English children's writers
English male dramatists and playwrights
English male novelists
English male screenwriters
English male short story writers
English non-fiction writers
English radio writers
English science fiction writers
English television producers
English television writers
People from East Ham
People from Hampstead
Science fiction critics
Writers from London
Writers of Doctor Who novels
Writers of young adult science fiction